The Naracoorte Herald is a weekly newspaper first published in Naracoorte, South Australia on 14 December 1875. It was later sold to Rural Press, previously owned by Fairfax Media, but now an Australian media company trading as Australian Community Media.

History
The Narracoorte Herald was founded in 1875 by Andrew F. Laurie (1843–1920) and John Watson (–1925) as an offshoot of their Border Watch and run by John B. Mather and Archibald Caldwell (1855–1942), who had learned the trade at the Border Watch. Caldwell left soon after, and the paper was purchased by Mather and George Ash and they ran the business until 1889. In that year Mather and Ash were successfully sued by William Hutchison, J.P., for a libel accusing the wealthy squatter of dummying, and giving the opinion that Justices of the Peace should be free of such taint. Considerable sympathy was felt by the farming community for Ash and Mather, and they had a legislative council champion in A. M. Simpson, but after a Supreme Court trial under Justice Boucaut lasting ten days, Hutchison was vindicated, and Mather and Ash lost all they had. The paper was forced to close at the end of August 1889; publishing resumed with the issue of 25 October after Archibald returned to purchase the business, and with his brother Dugald Caldwell ran it until his death. Dugald then took over the business, assisted by his niece Jean Anderson. 

In 1912, a nearby publication, the Tatiara and Lawloit News (13 June 1908 – 15 June 1912), which also printed in Naracoorte, was absorbed. In 1948, Dugald sold the business to James L. Thomson, a long-serving employee, and along with a new owner came an updated name, The Naracoorte Herald. The Post Office, Railways and other government departments had standardised the town's spelling to "Naracoorte" before 1896, but like the editor of the Narandera Argus, Archibald Caldwell doggedly stuck to the original orthography. In another modernisation, and given the evolution of the media in the post-war era, a collaboration was also in place between the Herald, Mount Gambier's Border Watch and Bordertown's Border Chronicle. 

Harry and Margaret Peake bought the paper in 1958 and their son Richard Peake and his wife Judith Barton took over in 1979. It was owned by Fairfax Regional Media from October 2010 to 2019. The Naracoorte Herald temporarily ceased operations in March 2020 and resumed printing in July 2020. In May 2020, a rival weekly publication, The Naracoorte Community News (stylised as Naracoorte Community: The News), began printing while the Herald was suspended.

Distribution
The newspaper serves the regions around the towns of Lucindale, Penola, Padthaway and Frances. Like other Rural Press publications, the newspaper is also available online.

Digitisation
Australian National Library's carries images and text versions of the newspaper from 1875 to 1954, accessible using Trove, the on-line newspaper retrieval service.

References

External links
Naracoorte Herald website

Publications established in 1875
Newspapers published in South Australia
Weekly newspapers published in Australia